The Durham Cricket Board is the governing body for all recreational cricket in the historic county of Durham.

From 1999 to 2003 the Board fielded a team in the English domestic one-day tournament, matches which had List-A status.

References

External links
 Durham Cricket Board

County Cricket Boards
Cricket in County Durham